Mark Casale (born September 17, 1962) is a former American football quarterback who played one season with the Toronto Argonauts of the Canadian Football League. He was drafted by the Chicago Bears in the ninth round of the 1984 NFL Draft. He played college football at Montclair State University. Casale was also a member of the New York Knights of the Arena Football League.

References

External links
Just Sports Stats

Living people
1962 births
Players of American football from New Jersey
American football quarterbacks
Canadian football quarterbacks
American players of Canadian football
Montclair State Red Hawks football players
Toronto Argonauts players
New York Knights (arena football) players